The Faraway Places is an American indie rock band. Originally formed in Boston, Massachusetts, United States, as the Solar Saturday, they changed their name after moving to Los Angeles, California.

History
The group issued its first EP as a self-titled affair under the name Solar Saturday in 2001. Members Chris Colthart and Donna Coppola had previously accompanied Papas Fritas on a tour promoting their third album Buildings and Grounds (2000). Following a move to Los Angeles, the group reconvened with Colthart, Coppola, Chris Phillips, and Scott Barber, and changed its name to Faraway Places. In 2003, they released a full-length on Eenie Meenie Records, which received enough attention to warrant a European release through the Bella Union label. The record won the group comparisons to XTC and the Elephant 6 collective. A follow-up arrived in 2009.

Members
Chris Colthart - guitar, vocals
Donna Coppola - keyboard, vocals
Scott Barber - bass
Eric Bartels - drums

Former
Jeff Wright - bass
Chris Phillips - drums

Discography

References

External links
The Faraway Places's former official web site

Indie rock musical groups from Massachusetts
Musical groups from Boston
Bella Union artists